Date and time notation in Japan has historically followed the Japanese calendar and the nengō system of counting years. At the beginning of the Meiji period, Japan switched to the Gregorian calendar on Wednesday, 1 January 1873, but for much domestic and regional government paperwork, the Japanese year is retained. Japanese people and businesses have also adopted various conventions in accordance with their use of kanji, the widespread use of passenger trains, and other aspects of daily life.

Date

The most commonly used date format in Japan is "year month day (weekday)", with the Japanese characters meaning "year", "month" and "day" inserted after the numerals. Example:  for "Wednesday 31 December 2008". Apart from the Gregorian calendar, the Japanese imperial calendar is also used, which bases the year on the current era, which began when the current emperor acceded to the throne. The current era is  Reiwa and began in 2019. When using the imperial calendar, the year is prefixed with the era. For example, the above date using the imperial calendar is written as: ; a more direct translation might be: Heisei year 20, Dec 31 (Wed).

Either form may be abbreviated as yy/mm/dd; periods as separators are not uncommon either. Examples: , . This is a shorthand notation and full dates are often the preferred way of resolving such ambiguities.

Time

Both the 12-hour and 24-hour notations are commonly used in Japan. The 24-hour notation is commonly used in Japan, especially in train schedules. The AM/PM signs are also used, while the sign may be placed either before or after the time (AM10:00 or 10:00AM).

Using the Japanese notation, times are written as "", with the characters for "hour" and "minute" (optionally also  for "seconds") added after the numerals. It is also common to simply write  though.

Times past midnight can also be counted past the 24 hour mark, usually when the associated activity spans across midnight. For example, bars or clubs may advertise as being open until "" (i.e. 6 am). This is partly to avoid any ambiguity (6 am versus 6 pm), partly because the closing time is considered part of the previous business day, and perhaps also due to cultural perceptions that the hours of darkness are counted as part of the previous day, rather than dividing the night between one day and the next. Television stations will also frequently use this notation in their late-night scheduling. This 30-hour clock form is rarely used in conversation.

References

Time in Japan
Japan